Legionella drancourtii is a Gram-negative bacterium from the genus Legionella  which occurs in nature as a strictly intracellular parasite of free-living amoebae. L. drancourtii is named after Michel Drancourt.

References

External links
Type strain of Legionella drancourtii at BacDive -  the Bacterial Diversity Metadatabase

Legionellales
Bacteria described in 2004